Tarapur may refer to places in India:

 Tarapur, Bihar
 Tarapur, Gujarat
 Tarapur, Madhya Pradesh
 Tarapur, Maharashtra
Tarapur Atomic Power Station
 Tarapur, Odisha
 Tarapur, Murshidabad
 Tarapur, Raebareli, a village in Uttar Pradesh

See also
Tarapore